The 1994 Sun Belt Conference men's basketball tournament was held March 4–7 at the E. A. Diddle Arena at Western Kentucky University in Bowling Green, Kentucky.

 defeated top-seeded hosts  in the championship game, 78–72, to win their second Sun Belt men's basketball tournament. It was USL's second Sun Belt title in three years.

The Ragin' Cajuns, in turn, received an automatic bid to the 1994 NCAA tournament. Fellow Sun Belt member Western Kentucky joined them in the tournament, earning an at-large bid.

Format
No teams left or joined the Sun Belt before the season, leaving conference membership fixed at ten teams.

With all teams participating in the tournament this year, the field increased from nine to ten teams. With all teams seeded based on regular-season conference records, the top six teams were all placed directly into the quarterfinal round while the four lowest-seeded teams were placed into the preliminary first round.

Bracket

See also
Sun Belt Conference women's basketball tournament

References

Sun Belt Conference men's basketball tournament
Tournament
Sun Belt Conference men's basketball tournament
Sun Belt Conference men's basketball tournament
College sports tournaments in Kentucky